Karabakhli (Gharabaghli) is a village in the Tarumovsky District of Dagestan, Russia.

Geography 
It is located 8 kilometres from Tarumovka, the administrative centre of Tarumovsky District.

History 
The village was founded in 1797 by Armenian refugees from Derbent. The name of the village was given in honour of their homeland.

Currently, Karabakhli is the only settlement in Dagestan where Armenians constitute a significant proportion of the population.

Population

Demographics 
According to the 1926 Soviet census:

According to the 2010 Russian census:

Of the 702 people in the 2010 census, 329 were men and 373 were women.

References 

Rural localities in Tarumovsky District